Kenneth Raisma (born 3 April 1998) is an Estonian tennis player.

Raisma has a career high ATP singles ranking of 676, achieved on 8 May 2017. He also has a career high ATP doubles ranking of 720, achieved on 28 January 2019. Raisma has won 1 ITF singles and 5 doubles titles.

Playing for Estonia in Davis Cup, Raisma has a win–loss record of 14–5.

Raisma won the 2016 Wimbledon Championships – Boys' doubles title alongside Stefanos Tsitsipas.

Junior Grand Slam finals

Boys' doubles

Future and Challenger finals

Singles: 3 (1–2)

Doubles 11 (5–6)

Davis Cup

Participations: (14–5)

   indicates the outcome of the Davis Cup match followed by the score, date, place of event, the zonal classification and its phase, and the court surface.

External links
 
 
 

1998 births
Living people
Estonian male tennis players
Sportspeople from Tallinn
Sportspeople from Tartu
Wimbledon junior champions
Grand Slam (tennis) champions in boys' doubles
21st-century Estonian people